Rhinorrhea, rhinorrhoea, or informally runny nose is the free discharge of a thin mucus fluid from the nose; it is a common condition. It is a common symptom of allergies (hay fever) or certain viral infections, such as the common cold or COVID-19. It can be a side effect of crying, exposure to cold temperatures, cocaine abuse, or drug withdrawal, such as from methadone or other opioids. Treatment for rhinorrhea is not usually undertaken, but there are a number of medical treatments and preventive techniques.

The term was coined in 1866 from the Greek rhino- ("of the nose") and -rhoia ("discharge" or "flow").

Signs and symptoms

Rhinorrhea is characterized by an excess amount of mucus produced by the mucous membranes that line the nasal cavities. The membranes create mucus faster than it can be processed, causing a backup of mucus in the nasal cavities. As the cavity fills up, it blocks off the air passageway, causing difficulty breathing through the nose. Air caught in nasal cavities, namely the sinus cavities, cannot be released and the resulting pressure may cause a headache or facial pain. If the sinus passage remains blocked, there is a chance that sinusitis may result. If the mucus backs up through the Eustachian tube, it may result in ear pain or an ear infection. Excess mucus accumulating in the throat or back of the nose may cause a post-nasal drip, resulting in a sore throat or coughing. Additional symptoms include sneezing, nosebleeds, and nasal discharge.

Causes
The Mayo Clinic says that a runny nose can be caused by anything that irritates or inflames the nasal tissues, including infections such as the common cold and influenza, and allergies and various irritants. Some people have a chronically runny nose for no apparent reason (non-allergic rhinitis or vasomotor rhinitis). Less common causes include polyps, a foreign body, a tumor or migraine-like headaches. Causes listed (alphabetically) and discussed are: acute sinusitis (nasal and sinus infection), allergies, chronic sinusitis, common cold, coronavirus disease 2019 (COVID-19), decongestant nasal spray overuse, deviated septum, dry air, eosinophilic granulomatosis with polyangiitis, granulomatosis with polyangiitis, hormonal changes, influenza (flu), lodged object, medicines (such as those used to treat high blood pressure, erectile dysfunction, depression, seizures and other conditions), nasal polyps, non-allergic rhinitis (chronic congestion or sneezing not related to allergies), occupational asthma, pregnancy, respiratory syncytial virus (RSV), spinal fluid leak, and tobacco smoke.

Cold temperatures
Rhinorrhea is especially common in cold weather. Cold-induced rhinorrhea occurs due to a combination of thermodynamics and the body's natural reactions to cold weather stimuli. One of the purposes of nasal mucus is to warm inhaled air to body temperature as it enters the body; this requires the nasal cavities to be constantly coated with liquid mucus. In cold weather the mucus lining nasal passages tends to dry out, so that mucous membranes must work harder, producing more mucus to keep the cavity lined. As a result, the nasal cavity can fill up with mucus. At the same time, when air is exhaled, water vapor in breath condenses as the warm air meets the colder outside temperature near the nostrils. This causes excess  water to build up inside nasal cavities, spilling out through the nostrils.

Inflammatory

Infection
Rhinorrhea can be a symptom of other diseases, such as the common cold or influenza. During these infections, the nasal mucous membranes produce excess mucus, filling the nasal cavities. This is to prevent infection from spreading to the lungs and respiratory tract, where it could cause far worse damage. It has also been suggested that rhinorrhea is a result of viral evolution whereby virus variants that increase nasal secretion are selected for. Rhinorrhea caused by these infections usually occur on circadian rhythms. Over the course of a viral infection, sinusitis (the inflammation of the nasal tissue) may occur, causing the mucous membranes to release more mucus. Acute sinusitis consists of the nasal passages swelling during a viral infection. Chronic sinusitis occurs when one or more nasal polyps appear. This can be caused by a deviated septum as well as a viral infection.

Allergies

Rhinorrhea can also occur when individuals with allergies to certain substances, such as pollen, dust, latex, soy, shellfish, or animal dander, are exposed to these allergens. In people with sensitized immune systems, the inhalation of one of these substances triggers the production of the antibody immunoglobulin E (IgE), which binds to mast cells and basophils. IgE bound to mast cells are stimulated by pollen and dust, causing the release of inflammatory mediators such as histamine. In turn, this causes, among other things, inflammation and swelling of the tissue of the nasal cavities as well as increased mucus production. Particulate matter in polluted air and chemicals such as chlorine and detergents, which can normally be tolerated, can make the condition considerably worse.

Crying
Rhinorrhea is also associated with shedding tears (lacrimation), whether from emotional events or from eye irritation. When excess tears are produced, the liquid drains through the inner corner of the eyelids, through the nasolacrimal duct, and into the nasal cavities. As more tears are shed, more liquid flows into the nasal cavities, both stimulating mucus production and hydrating any dry mucus already present in the nasal cavity. The buildup of fluid is usually resolved via mucus expulsion through the nostrils.

Non-inflammatory

Head trauma

Rhinorrhea can be caused by a head injury, a serious condition. A basilar skull fracture can result in a rupture of the barrier between the sinonasal cavity and the anterior cranial fossae or the middle cranial fossae. This can cause the nasal cavity to fill with cerebrospinal fluid (cerebrospinal fluid rhinorrhoea, CSF rhinorrhea), a condition that can lead to a number of serious complications, including death if not addressed properly.

Other causes
Rhinorrhea can occur as a symptom of opioid withdrawal accompanied by lacrimation. When it occurs due to exercise, it is described as exercise-induced rhinitis. Other causes include cystic fibrosis, whooping cough, nasal tumors, hormonal changes, and cluster headaches. Due to changes in clinical practice, rhinorrhea is now reported as a frequent side effect of oxygen-intubation during colonoscopy procedures. Rhinorrhea can also be the side effect of several genetic disorders, such as primary ciliary dyskinesia.

Treatment
In most cases, treatment for rhinorrhea is not necessary since it will clear up on its own, especially if it is the symptom of an infection. For general cases nose-blowing can get rid of the mucus buildup. Though blowing may be a quick-fix solution, it would likely proliferate mucosal production in the sinuses, leading to frequent and higher mucus buildups in the nose. Alternatively, saline or vasoconstrictor nasal sprays may be used, but may become counterproductive after several days of use, causing rhinitis medicamentosa.

In recurring cases, such as those due to allergies, there are medicinal treatments available. Several types of antihistamines can be obtained relatively cheaply to treat cases caused by histamine buildup.

References

External links 
 Coping with colds and flu (NHS Direct)

Symptoms and signs: Respiratory system
Nose disorders